The Italian (in the original, L'italiano) is a novel by the Italian writer Sebastiano Vassalli. It was published in 2007 by the publishing house Einaudi. It is dedicated to the publisher Giulio Bollati. The title is "L’Italiano" because it deals with eleven different stories of Italian people. According to WorldCat, the Italian edition is held book is held in 137 libraries.

Plot

Who, me? 
During the Doomsday, God called all the men of the world: the English, the Chinese, the Turkish, the Potoguese,... He assigns a place in Hell or Heaven to everyone until he called the Italian. At first the Italian didn't answer but then he realised he was calling him and said :"Who, me?"

The doge 
The doge is the first character of the book. His name is Ludovico Manin, he is the last of Venice doges. He was considered the most important figure of the city. When the Austrians arrived, he was considered guilty to have betrayed his nation. 
While he was walking through the streets of Venice, he sees the miserable conditions of his people and to help them he leaves all his riches to the poor children.

The priest 
A group of priests are travelling on a wagon after they have been exiled by Napoleon. They arrive in Piacenza and two of the priests, father Francis and father Caspar decide to go to the inn "Luna Rossa". Because they don't have enough many to pay for a room they are forced to sleep in a stable. The next day when they leave, for another city, they curse the city of Piacenza.

The banker 
Emanuele Nortarbartolo is on a train to Palermo. He is thinking of the political situation in Italy and the scandal of the bank of Rome. He also had to fight against a group of mafiosos. Suddenly two men jumped on his own carriage. He tried to defend himself but he was killed by two mysterious men.
Father of the nation
Francesco Crispi was looking out of the window thinking of his whole life: his first love, the reading of the poet Vincenzo Navarro, the general Garibaldi, the experience of war and his liberation.

The tenor 
The doorman, Eraldo Fortis, has just come back from war and all his friends want him to tell about his experience on the front. He decides to talk about Pasquale Esposito nicknamed Caruso. He was the messenger of the Italian army but he was afraid to cross the border, so the other soldiers forced him to get drunk. While he is walking in the snow he starts singing folk songs that made all the soldiers feel at home.

The dissident 
This short story is about three characters: the captain, Cesare Forn,i a war hero, Raimondo Sala, mayor of Alessandria and Guido Giroldi the political assistant of Forni.

The trasformist 
Saverio Polito is the symbol of metamorphosis of Italian people from Fascist to Antifascist. This chapter includes the depositions of Benito Mussolini and his wife Rachele.

The policeman 
The policeman Orazio Petruccelli was waiting with other Italian soldiers for his execution by the Germans. He is loyal to his nation and before dying he shouts: "Long live the King!"

The feminist 
Sibilla Aleramo is an Italian author and companion of Dino Campana and many others poets. She is discussing with her neighbour Costanza about abortion but she doesn't know how to help her because she has never had a child and never need to abort.
Costanza doesn't believe her and Sibilla understands what people really think of her.

The two revolutionaries 
During the conferences/ Palmiro Togliatti, the leader of the Italian communist party,is defined by two students  as a conservative and a traitor of the nation.

Mister B 
A writer and his friend talk about Mr. B also known as "L’Arcitaliano" a relevant figure in politics and literature. Some Italians love him while others hate him because he is a character that comes from the illegal Italy made of corrupted people and the Mafia. Not all Italians are criminals so the two friends conclude saying that Italy is divided in two different nations: the legal and illegal Italy

Yes, you 
God examined that the Italian made good thinds such as pizza and bad things such as Fascism and the Mafia. The Italian justifies himself denying the things he had done and God allocates him to Limbo, a place for children.
Vassalli thinks that the Italian people are changing a lot and he writes about lacks and qualities of Italy.

References

2007 Italian novels
Giulio Einaudi Editore books